Hammerschmidtia sedmani, the pale-bristled logsitter, is an uncommon species of syrphid fly observed in North America. Hoverflies can remain nearly motionless in flight. The  adults are also  known as flower flies for they are commonly found on flowers from which they get both energy-giving nectar and protein rich pollen. Larvae are found under bark of recently fallen aspen.

References

Diptera of North America
Hoverflies of North America
Eristalinae
Insects described in 2019